The white-lipped tree frog (Nyctimystes infrafrenatus) is a species of frog in the subfamily Pelodryadinae. It is the world's largest tree frog (the Cuban tree frog reaches a similar maximum size) and is found in Australia. Other common names include the New Guinea treefrog, giant tree frog, and Australian giant treefrog.

Description
The white-lipped tree frog reaches  in length. Females are larger than males, and have thicker skin in correlation with the difference in body size. Its dorsal surface is usually bright green, although the colour changes depending on the temperature and background, and can be brown. The ventral surface is off-white. The lower lip has a distinctive white stripe (giving this species its name), which continues to the shoulder. The white stripes on the trailing edges of the lower leg may turn pink in the breeding male. The white-lipped tree frog has large toe pads, which aid it to climb. The toes are completely webbed, and the hands are partially webbed.

Ecology and behaviour
The white-lipped tree frog is found along the coastal areas of Cape York Peninsula and the wet tropics of north-eastern Queensland, Australia. It is the most widely distributed tree frog in the New Guinea region, spanning from eastern Indonesia, through the New Guinea mainland, to the Bismarck and the Admiralty Islands in the north. It lives in rainforests, cultivated areas, and around houses in coastal areas, and is restricted to areas below 1200 m in altitude.

It has a loud, barking call, but when distressed, it makes a cat-like "mew" sound or may discharge urine. Males call during spring and summer after rain from vegetation around the breeding site, normally a still body of water.

Its diet is mainly insects and other arthropods. It can live to over 10 years in the wild.

This species of frog is known for being moved around in fruit produce from northern Australia and ending up becoming a lost frog in southern areas.

As a pet
It is kept as a pet; but in Australia, it may be kept in captivity only with an appropriate permit.

Gallery

References

 Cronin, L., (2001). Australian Reptiles and Amphibians, Envirobook, 
 Cogger, H.G. (2000). Reptiles and amphibians of Australia. Reed Books: Sydney.

External links

Queensland Department of Environment and Science: White-lipped tree frog—Conservation status and audio of frog call
Frog Australia Network—frog call available here.

Article Road: List of All Frog Breeds: Things You Can Do to Ensure Your Frog Has a Long, Happy and Healthy Life: White Lipped Tree Frog
Department of Environment, Climate Change and Water, New South Wales: Amphibian Keeper's Licence: Species Lists

Nyctimystes
Amphibians of Queensland
Amphibians of Indonesia
Amphibians of Papua New Guinea
Amphibians of New Guinea
Fauna of Timor
Amphibians described in 1867
Taxa named by Albert Günther
Frogs of Australia